Staraya Chigla is a rural locality (a selo) and the administrative center of Starochigolskoye Rural Settlement, Anninsky District, Voronezh Oblast, Russia. The population was 792 as of 2010. There are 9 streets.

Geography 
Staraya Chigla is located 32 km south of Anna (the district's administrative centre) by road. Zagorshchino is the nearest rural locality.

References 

Rural localities in Anninsky District